Na'Shan Goddard (born April 23, 1983) is a former American football offensive tackle. He was signed by the New York Giants as an undrafted free agent in 2006. He played college football at South Carolina. He is now the offensive line coach at South Carolina State.

Goddard was a member of the New York Jets, Seattle Seahawks, New Orleans Saints, New York Giants, Florida Tuskers, Virginia Destroyers and Calgary Stampeders.

External links
 Just Sports stats
 New York Giants bio
 Seattle Seahawks bio
 South Carolina Gamecocks bio
 Calgary Stampeders

1983 births
Living people
Players of American football from Dayton, Ohio
Players of Canadian football from Dayton, Ohio
African-American players of American football
African-American players of Canadian football
American football offensive tackles
American football offensive guards
Canadian football offensive linemen
South Carolina Gamecocks football players
New York Giants players
New York Jets players
Seattle Seahawks players
New Orleans Saints players
Florida Tuskers players
Virginia Destroyers players
Calgary Stampeders players
21st-century African-American sportspeople
20th-century African-American people